Nidularium bicolor is a plant species in the genus Nidularium. This species is endemic to Brazil.

References

bicolor
Flora of Brazil